J Album is the eleventh studio album released by Japanese duo KinKi Kids on December 9, 2009. The album was certified gold by the RIAJ for 100,000 copies shipped to stores in Japan.

Commercial performance
J Album debuted at number-one with the sales of around 72,000 copies on the Japanese Oricon daily charts. It maintained its number-one spot with the sales of around 170,000 copies on the Japanese Oricon weekly charts.

Track listing

Charts

Weekly charts

Sales and certifications

References

External links
 J Album Information at Oricon Style

2009 albums
KinKi Kids albums